Gomory may refer to:
 Ralph E. Gomory, researcher and mathematician 
 Gomory's theorem, so named for the mathematician
 Gremory, a demon sometimes written as Gomory

See also
 Gomery